The Diocese of UK, Europe and Africa is one of the 30 dioceses of the Malankara Orthodox Syrian Church with its headquarters in London.

History
The roots of this parish can be traced back to the 1930s. Abu Alexios of the Bethany monastery (later Bishop Mar Theodosius) was the first priest of the church ever to visit the UK. Canon John Douglas and others formed an association called 'The Friends of the Syrian Church' to render help to the ancient church in India by offering higher theological training; Abu Alexios of the Bethany monastery (later Bishop Mar Theodosius) was the first candidate chosen. He participated in the Jubilee celebrations of the Community of Resurrection, Mirfield and made connections with several religious communities in UK.

The second priest who came to UK under this scheme was Fr. T.V.John of U.C. college Alwaye in 1934. He conducted Holy Qurbana in Malayalam in Kings College chapel. Several others came to the UK under this programme. Catholicose, Moran Mar Baselios Mar Geeverghese II visited in 1937, accompanied by Rambans C M Thomas (later Metropolitan Mar Dioionysius) and Abu Alexiosto for the second "Faith and Order Conference" of the World Council of Churches in Edinburgh. After the conference Ramban C.M.Thomas stayed with the Cowley fathers for studies in Oxford and conducted services.

In the 1950s and 60s the Malayalee Christian community had grown gradually, however, services were held only occasionally by visiting priests and prelates. They include Metropolitan Mathews Mar Coorilos (late catholicos Moran Mar Baselios Marthoma Mathews II) Fr.K Philipose (late metropolitan Mar Theophilus) Fr.Dr.C.T.Eapen, Fr.P.S.Samuel, and others. Fr.P.V.Joseph (late Mar Pachomios), Fr.Yohannan (late metropolitan Mar Athanasius) came to UK for higher studies and served the community. Fr. Philipose visited the congregation on several occasions during his trips to Europe in connection with the various programs of the World Council of Churches, and later became bishop Mar Theophilus. Dn. K.G.George (later bishop Geverghese Mar Ivanios) followed the footsteps and stayed with Cawley Fathers in Oxford for six years. All these years services were conducted in Indian YMCA chapel, Fitzroy Square, London and all the Malayalee Christians participated irrespective of their denominational differences.
In early 1970s Geverghese Mar Osthathios organized the St. Gregorios fellowship during one of his pastoral visits. The community grew in size with the arrival of more migrants; in 1974 they split on denominational grounds. Members of Orthodox Syrian Church and Marthoma Church formed separate congregations and commenced worshipping separately.

When the diocese outside Kerala was re-organized, diocesan metropolitan Thomas Mar Makarios visited the UK church in 1976 and declared as a parish with St. Gregorios of Parumala as patron saint; Fr. Abraham Aluckal (later bishop Mar Severios) was appointed as its first vicar. In the 1979 re-organization of the dioceses, the London parish came under the diocese of Delhi under the pastoral care of Paulos Mar Gregorios, who visited the parish on a regular basis. When the new diocese of Europe, UK and Canada was formed in 1993, this parish came under the jurisdiction of Thomas Mar Makarios. With the establishment of the new diocese of UK, Europe and Africa, Mathews Mar Thimothios took charge as the Metropolitan of the London parish.

Fr. Mathews M. Daniel, Philipose Mar Eusebius, Kuriakose Cor-Episcopa, O. Thomas, Geverghese Mar Coorilose, Yakoob Mar Elias (Fr. V. M. James), Fr. Yohannan Ramban, Fr. Skariah Ramban, and Fr. Abraham Thomas served in succession as vicars of the parish. Services were held in London since 1978 in the Church of England St. Andrew-by-the-Wardrobe Church, and since 2005 in St. Gregorios Church Brockley, London.

Since 2009
The Diocese of UK, Europe and Africa was formed in 2009, with Diocesan Metropolitan Mathews Mar Thimothios. Diocese of UK, Europe and Africa includes the territorial area of England, Wales, Northern Ireland and Germany, France, Ireland, Switzerland, Spain, Portugal, Denmark, Turkey, Greece, Cape Town in South Africa and Kenya.

The Diocesan headquarters is Malankara House, 35 Hennman Close, Swindon, SN25 4ZW, UK. The Administrative Annexe in India is in Parumala Seminary. This was consecrated by Baselios Mar Thoma Didymus I Valiya Bava.  the diocese had 41 Parishes and Congregations across 10 countries.

Diocesan Metropolitan

List of parishes in the UK, Europe and Africa
 St. Stephen's Indian Orthodox Church, Birmingham, England
 St. Mary's Indian Orthodox Church, Bristol, England
 St. Thomas Indian Orthodox Church, Cambridge, England
 St. Gregorios Indian Orthodox Church, Peterborough, England
 St. Thomas' Indian Orthodox Church, London, England

 St. Mary's Indian Orthodox Church, Coventry, England
 St. George's Indian Orthodox Congregation, Leicester, England
 St. Thomas Indian Orthodox Church, Liverpool, England
 St. Gregorios Indian Orthodox Church, London, England
 St. George's Indian Orthodox Church, Manchester, England
 St. Dionysius Indian Orthodox Church, Northampton, England
 St. Mary's Indian Orthodox Church, Oxford, England
 St. Thomas Indian Orthodox Church, Dorset, England
 St. George's Indian Orthodox Church, Portsmouth, England
  Mar Baselios Gregorios Indian Orthodox Congregation, Southampton, England
 St. George's Indian Orthodox Church, Sheffield, England
 St. Thomas Indian Orthodox Church, Sunderland, England
 St. Thomas Indian Orthodox Church, Dublin, Ireland
 St. Mary's Indian Orthodox Church, Lucan, County Dublin, Ireland. 
 St. Thomas Indian Orthodox Church, Aberdeen, Scotland
 St. Gregorios Indian Orthodox Congregation, Glasgow, Scotland
 St.Gregorios Indian Orthodox Church, Waterford, Ireland.
 Holy Trinity Indian Orthodox Congregation, Cork, Ireland.
 St. Elijah Indian Orthodox Congregation, Galway, Ireland.
 The Holy Innocents Indian Orthodox Church Congregation, Neath, Wales
 Lagos St.Stephens Indian Orthodox Church
 Switzerland St.Gregories Indian Orthodox Church
 South Africa St.Thomas Indian Orthodox Church
 Bielefeld St.Gregorios Indian Orthodox Church
 Bonn Kolome St.Gregorios Orthodox Church
 Belfast St.Gregorios Indian Orthodox Church
 Crawley Holy Trinity Indian Orthodox Church
 Doghedra St.peters and St.pauls Indian Orthodox Church
 Stoke-on-Trent St.Johns the Baptist Indian Orthodox Church
 King's Lynn St.Marys Indian Orthodox Church
 Limerick St.George Indian Orthodox
 North Wales St.Behanans Indian Orthodox Church
 Preston St.George Indian Orthodox Church
 Southend-on-sea St.Gregorios Indian Orthodox Church
 Vienna St.Thomas Indian Orthodox Church
 Woking St.Thomas Indian Orthodox Church
 St Peters and St Paul's Indian Orthodox Congregation,Malta

References

External links
Official website of Malankara Orthodox Church
Official website of UK, Europe and Africa Diocese
 stthomasiocaberdeen.co.uk
 ststephensioc.co.uk
 stmarysindianorthodoxchurchbristol
 ndianorthodoxchurchglasgow.co.uk
 stthomasorthodoxlondon.org
 indianorthodoxchurchkingslynn.co.uk
 indian-orthodox.co.uk
 oxfordmalankaraorthodox.co.uk

Malankara Orthodox Syrian Church dioceses
Oriental Orthodoxy in the United Kingdom
Oriental Orthodoxy in Europe
Oriental Orthodoxy in Africa
Christian organizations established in 2009